Ernist Muratovich Batyrkanov (born February 21, 1998) is a Kyrgyzstani footballer who plays for Kelantan United in the Malaysia Super League and Kyrgyzstan national football team as a forward.

Career

Club
He won the Kyrgyzstan League with Dordoi Bishkek in 2018.

In February 2019, Batyrkanov went on trial with Spartak Trnava.

In February 2021, Batyrkanov signed for Kazakhstan Premier League club FC Kyzylzhar. On 15 July 2021, Batyrkanov left Kyzylzhar.

On 7 August 2021, Armenian Premier League club FC Van announced the signing of Batyrkanov. On 27 December 2021, Batyrkanov left Van.

International
Batyrkanov made his debut for Kyrgyzstan national football team in a friendly match on 6 September 2018 against Palestine. He was included in Kyrgyzstan's squad for the 2018 Asian Games in Indonesia, and the 2019 AFC Asian Cup in the United Arab Emirates.

On 11 June 2021 Batyrkanov played in goal for Kyrgyzstan in a 2022 World Cup qualifier against Myanmar. No other goalkeepers were available due to suspected COVID-19. Kyrgyzstan won the match 1-8.

Career statistics

International

Kyrgyzstan score listed first, score column indicates score after each Batyrkanov goal

References

External links

1997 births
Living people
Sportspeople from Bishkek
Kyrgyzstan international footballers
Kyrgyzstani footballers
Association football forwards
FC Dordoi Bishkek players
Footballers at the 2018 Asian Games
2019 AFC Asian Cup players
Asian Games competitors for Kyrgyzstan
Kelantan United F.C. players